Alexander Sorge (born 21 April 1993) is a German professional footballer who plays as a centre-back for  club Erzgebirge Aue.

Career
In summer 2018, FSV Zwickau decided not to renew Sorge's contract after he suffered two severe, career-threatening knee injuries. In August, however, after his recovery he received a new season-long deal.

On 2 June 2022, Sorge signed a two-year contract with 3. Liga club Erzgebirge Aue, after his former club Türkgücü München had been relegated after filing for insolvency.

References

External links
 
 

1993 births
Living people
German footballers
Association football defenders
FSV Zwickau players
Türkgücü München players
FC Erzgebirge Aue players
3. Liga players
Footballers from Leipzig